Gorgons Head is a peak southeast of Mount Hughes in the Cook Mountains of Antarctica. The peak is sandstone with dolerite intrusions and is a sharp summit ridge. It was named after the Gorgons, three winged creatures of Greek mythology only one of which (Medusa) could be killed by having its head cut off.

References

Mountains of Oates Land